Terrebonne Parish (French: Paroisse de Terrebonne) is a parish located in the southern part of the U.S. state of Louisiana. At the 2020 census, the population was 109,580. The parish seat is Houma. The parish was founded in 1822. Terrebonne Parish is part of the Houma-Thibodaux metropolitan statistical area.

It is the fifth-largest parish in the state in terms of land area, and it has been a center of Cajun culture since the 18th century. More than 10% of its residents speak French at home.

Ray Authement, who was the fifth president of the University of Louisiana at Lafayette, serving from 1974 to 2008 and the longest-serving president of a public university in the United States, was born in rural Terrebonne Parish in 1928, near Chauvin. In 2014 Juan Pickett, former Assistant District Attorney, was elected unopposed in the 32nd Judicial District as the first black judge in Terrebone Parish history.

History
The parish seat of Houma was named after the Houma people. The native word houma means red, and the tribe's war emblem was the crawfish. Historians say the Houma are related to the Muskogean-speaking Choctaw, and migrated into the area from present-day Mississippi and Alabama. They first settled in the area that developed as Baton Rouge. After many conflicts with other Indian tribes, and losing a war to the Tunica in 1706, the Houma Indians continued moving south to more remote areas in the bayous, in order to escape the encroachment of Europeans. They settled in present-day Terrebonne Parish in the mid- to late 18th century. They established a camp known as Ouiski Bayou on the high ground northwest of what later developed as downtown Houma. They were subsequently pushed from the highlands of the north to the coastal regions of the south by the European settlements in the late 1700s and 1800s. Evidence of the Houma Tribe can still be found in this area today.

One of the southernmost of Louisiana's parishes, Terrebonne Parish was established on March 22, 1822, from the southern part of Lafourche Interior, bordering on the Gulf of Mexico. Covering an area of 2100 square miles, it is the second-largest parish in the state. The early French settlers named the parish for the fertility of its soils: terre bonne means "good earth."

In 1834, Terrebonne Parish founded the city of Houma in order to establish a centrally located and more easily accessible parish seat. Prior to this, the county seat had been set at Williamsburg (now Bayou Cane), approximately four miles northwest of present-day downtown Houma. Government officials believed that the site of Houma, at the convergence of six bayous, would provide better access for commerce and development in Terrebonne Parish, as most transportation and shipping was by water. It was near a former settlement of the Houma Tribe of Native Americans. Williamsburg was at the junction of two bayous: Cane and Terrebonne.

European and African settlers 
Most of the European settlers who came to Terrebonne migrated from along the Mississippi River, down Bayou Lafourche to Bayou Terrebonne. There was an influx of French colonists from New Orleans to the bayou country in 1762 after the Spanish took over rule of the colony following the French defeat by the British in the Seven Years' War (known as the French and Indian War in North America). The district Spanish commandant granted concessions of title to not more than 630 acres of land for each newcomer to the bayou lands. While many Frenchmen came into the area prior to this, British and Spanish colonists also recorded claims.

Other settlers in the area in 1760 were French colonists from Acadia (modern Nova Scotia), who had been expelled by the British in 1755 during the Seven Years' War. They became known as "Cajuns" (Acadians). Many settled along the bayous in Terrebonne Parish. They chose this area because of its isolated geographic location, a minimum of government control, fertile land, and an abundance of fish and wildlife. These people lived in relative cultural seclusion for generations and continued their family traditions of living off the land. Today they celebrate their heritage through their festivals and church fairs.

In 1848, Houma was incorporated as a city by an act of legislature. By this time, industry in the Houma area consisted largely of plantations for sugar cane, dependent on the labor of enslaved African-Americans. Also important were harvesting seafood, fur trading, and logging industries. The cultivation of sugar cane was the principal agricultural industry in the parish. The first plantation in the parish was established in 1828. By 1851, Terrebonne had 110 plantations with 80 sugar houses (small sugar cane mills). Thousands of enslaved Africans were brought to the parish through the Trans-Atlantic slave trade.

Southdown Plantation was founded in 1828 by the Minor family. They held hundreds of enslaved Africans for sugar cane cultivation and processing. Stephen Minor had served as the Secretary to the Spanish Governor Gayoso of Louisiana. Today, the Minor family home, built in 1858 and enlarged in 1893, serves as the parish museum. The sugar mill was sold in 1979, dismantled and shipped to Guatemala, where it was reassembled. It is still in use today.

Settlers had canals dug between the bayous to decrease travel time within the parish and make trade more efficient. In 1872, a railroad that linked Schriever to Houma was instrumental in increasing trade and travel within and outside the parish.

In 1923, the construction of the Intracoastal Waterway led to the abandonment of the canals. The Intracoastal was later extended to Lafourche Parish and to Bayou Lafourche, increasing Houma's importance as a portal city.

20th century to present
During World War II, Houma was selected for the establishment of a Lighter Than Air Blimp Naval Station, which operated from May 1943 to September 1944. The Navy base, which used blimp squadrons to scan the coastline for enemy vessels, was one of only two blimp stations operating on the Gulf Coast.

Terrebonne has depended on natural resources: oysters, shrimp, crabs and fish contribute their share of wealth to the parish. In the great stretches of marshland surrounding Terrebonne parish, trapping of Louisiana muskrat, mink, otter, raccoon, and nutria pelts are another form of local commerce.

Development of oil and gas resources in the parish began in 1929, bringing a period of economic development and prosperity unparalleled anywhere in the state. The industry grew into enormous dimensions with the discovery of offshore oil. Terrebonne became the gateway to the most dense concentration of offshore oil service companies in the state. By 1960, with the combination of rich oil production backed by Houma's productive waters, fertile soil, and natural mineral resources, Houma became one of the fastest-growing cities in America. In 1961, the Houma Navigational Canal was completed to provide a 30-mile link to Terrebonne Bay and the Gulf of Mexico.

By the late 1970s, Houma's main focus was the oil industry. Those companies not related to oil and gas depended on this industry for their survival. When the bottom fell out of the oil industry in the early 1980s because of cheaper foreign product and dwindling local resources, Houma declined. For nearly two years, the Houma-Terrebonne area experienced an unemployment rate near 25%.

The Houma community has worked to diversify the parish economy. While the oil industry is still the primary source of revenue for the Houma-Terrebonne area, alternative industries are emerging. Terrebonne Parish accounts for more than 20% of Louisiana's seafood production. In addition, the medical industry is growing in the area. Tourism, too, is a popular source of commerce in and around Houma. The addition of Houma's new Civic Center promises to attract more entertainment and convention revenue to the city.

The draw of authentic Acadian culture, diverse environment and wildlife, plantation homes, excellent food, and close proximity to New Orleans, Baton Rouge, and Lafayette attracts visitors to Houma and its central location.

On August 29, 2021, Hurricane Ida made landfall in the parish.

Geography
It is the fifth-largest parish in Louisiana by land area and third-largest by total area. The Gulf of Mexico is located to the south of the parish.

The average height above sea level of the parish is about six feet. The parish is protected by extensive flood protection works.

Major highways
  Future Interstate 49
  U.S. Highway 90
  Louisiana Highway 24
  Louisiana Highway 55
  Louisiana Highway 56
  Louisiana Highway 57
  Louisiana Highway 58
  Louisiana Highway 315
  Louisiana Highway 311
  Louisiana Highway 182

Adjacent parishes 
 Assumption Parish (north)
 Lafourche Parish (east)
 St. Mary Parish (northwest)

National protected area
 Mandalay National Wildlife Refuge

Demographics

As of the 2020 United States census, there were 109,580 people, 40,173 households, and 28,808 families residing in the parish. The largest single ancestry group amongst its population was French American, at 20%, while 21,253 or 19.4% were African American. The median household income was $48,446; 20% of the population lived at or below the poverty line.

Education
Terrebonne Parish School District operates public schools.

It is in the service area of Fletcher Technical Community College and of South Louisiana Community College.

Government
The parish has been run by the Terrebonne Parish Consolidated Government since it absorbed the powers of the City of Houma. The parish is led by President Gordon Dove, elected in 2016. State Representatives Jerome Zeringue, and Beryl Amedee represent Terrebonne Parish in the Louisiana House.

The 32nd Judicial District has five judgeships, all of which are elected at-large. In 2014, Assistant District Attorney Juan Pickett was elected as the first black judge in the parish's history. He ran unopposed as a Republican. In 2015 he switched to the Democratic Party.

Earlier in 2014 the NAACP Legal Defense Fund, in cooperation with local plaintiffs, filed a lawsuit against the state of Louisiana for its system of at-large voting for the five judicial positions in Terrebone Parish. They said it violated the Voting Rights Act, as it diluted minority voting power. Minority residents in the parish were unable to elect candidates of their choice. (Earlier cases that went to the US Supreme Court established that the VRA covered elected judicial positions.)

In August 2017 the federal district court in Baton Rouge ruled that the parish's at-large voting was unconstitutional and discriminatory. US District Court Judge James Brady found that
“no black candidate who has faced opposition in Terrebonne has been elected to an at-large position and black candidates have received incredibly minimal support from white voters, a pattern which has been consistent over the course of more than 20 years.” The parties would be working on a remedy; a minority sub-district has been proposed among five single-member districts to elect these judges. The legislature would have to pass a law establishing such a change. The state said it would appeal the decision.

Law enforcement
The Terrebonne Parish Sheriff's Office is headquartered at the courthouse annex in Houma. Ithas about three hundred employees. The office is organized into a number of divisions including: Administration, criminal, civil, communications, corrections, and water Patrol.

Timothy Soignet, the current sheriff, took office on July 1, 2020. Jerry Larpenter, who became sheriff for the first time in 1987, stepped down briefly in 2008, and was re-elected in 2012. He announced he would not seek re-election in October 2019.

In 2017, the parish and the sheriff's office settled a civil case brought against them by a local couple in 2016. The couple operated a web site dedicated to exposing corruption. An individual named on the site filed a criminal defamation complaint with the Sheriff's Office. As a result, a search warrant issued by a parish judge was executed by deputies at the home of the couple, whose computer equipment was seized. No criminal charges were ultimately brought against them. In total the couple received $200,000 in settlements from several parish entities including the Sheriff's Office.

Representation in other media

 The parish was setting of the film The Skeleton Key (2005). (The movie was not filmed in the parish, however.)
 Terrebone Parish was the setting for the independent 2012 film Beasts of the Southern Wild, which was filmed in Montegut and inspired by the plight of bayou communities such as Isle de Jean Charles.
 In the DC Comics universe, the parish is the site of the fictional Belle Reve prison. 
 The parish is also the setting of A&E's reality series Cajun Justice, about the activities of the Parish Sheriff's Department.
 John Grisham's The Pelican Brief explored environmental issues in the parish resulting from oil production. It was adapted as a The Pelican Brief (film). The movie featured the murders of two state Supreme Court justices, and starred Julia Roberts and Denzel Washington.

National Guard
C Company 2-156th Infantry Battalion of the 256th IBCT resides in Houma, Louisiana.

D Company 2-156 Infantry Battalion of the 256 IBCT resides in Thibodaux, Louisiana

Communities

City
 Houma (parish seat)

Unincorporated areas

Census-designated places 

 Bayou Blue
 Bayou Cane
 Bourg
 Chauvin
 Dulac
 Gray
 Montegut
 Presquille
 Schriever

Other unincorporated communities 
 Ashland
 Chacahoula
 Cocodrie
 Gibson
 Isle de Jean Charles
 Pointe-aux-Chenes
 Theriot

Politics
Terrebonne is represented in the Louisiana House of Representatives by the Republican Jerome Zeringue. The Parish president is Republican Gordon Dove.

Since the 20th century, white voters in the parish have become majority Republican. Before the civil rights era, whites generally supported Democratic candidates throughout the South. The Southern Democrats, exclusively white, constituted a powerful block in Congress during the first part of the 20th century. The state legislature had essentially disenfranchised most African Americans at the turn of the century.

Voting in Terrebone Parish, as in the rest of Louisiana, has been racially polarized since African Americans recovered the ability to register and vote. Most African Americans have voted for Democratic candidates since Congress passed civil rights legislation in the mid-1960s. Since the white majority in the parish shifted to the Republican Party, since 1968 the only Democratic presidential candidate to carry Terrebone was Bill Clinton, a native son of Arkansas, in 1996.

See also

 Last Islands or Isles Dernières
 National Register of Historic Places listings in Terrebonne Parish, Louisiana
 Terrebonne Parish Sheriff's Office
 USS Terrebonne Parish (LST-1156)

References

External links
 Official site
 Terrebonne Parish School District
 Terrebonne Parish Sheriff's Office
 Houma Today (website of The Courier daily newspaper)
 Tri-Parish times (website of Tri-Parish times weekly regional newspaper)

 
Louisiana parishes
Parishes in Acadiana
Acadiana
Houma – Thibodaux metropolitan area
1822 establishments in Louisiana
Populated places established in 1822